Clarence Charles Kemp (31 October 1913 – 8 July 1943) was an Australian rugby league footballer who played in the 1930s.

A local junior from The Banksia junior rugby league football club, Kemp was graded in 1932. He played first grade between 1932-33 and remained with the club for a number of seasons in the lower grades until 1937.

Kemp died in an accident on the Hawksbury River Bridge on 8 July 1943.

References

St. George Dragons players
Australian rugby league players
1913 births
1943 deaths
Rugby league second-rows
City New South Wales rugby league team players
Rugby league players from Sydney
Accidental deaths by electrocution
Accidental deaths in New South Wales